Australiopalpa is a genus of moths in the family Gelechiidae.

Species
 Australiopalpa bumerang Povolný, 1974
 Australiopalpa commoni Povolný, 1974
 Australiopalpa tristis Povolný, 1974

References

Gnorimoschemini
Moth genera